RING finger protein 4 is a protein that in humans is encoded by the RNF4 gene.

The protein encoded by this gene contains a RING finger domain and acts as a transcription factor. This protein has been shown to interact with, and inhibit the activity of, TRPS1, a transcription suppressor of GATA-mediated transcription. Transcription repressor ZNF278/PATZ1 is found to interact with this protein, and thus reduce the enhancement of androgen receptor-dependent transcription mediated by this protein. Studies of the mouse and rat counterparts suggested a role of this protein in spermatogenesis.

Interactions 

RNF4 has been shown to interact with TCF20, PATZ1 and Androgen receptor.

See also 
 RING finger domain

References

Further reading

External links 
 

RING finger proteins